Melodi Grand Prix is an annual music competition in Norway.

Melodi Grand Prix may also refer to:

Dansk Melodi Grand Prix, an annual music competition in Denmark
Melodi Grand Prix Junior, a Norwegian television music competition for children
Melodi Grand Prix Junior (Denmark), a Danish song competition for children
Melodi Grand Prix Nordic, a Scandinavian song contest for children, 2002–2009

See also
MGP (disambiguation)
History of Melodi Grand Prix